Rajetići is a village in the municipality of Fojnica, Bosnia and Herzegovina.

Demographics 
According to the 2013 census, its population was nil, down from 73 in 1991.

References

Populated places in Fojnica